Hofsee may refer to one of several lakes in Germany:

in Mecklenburg-Vorpommern
Hofsee (Neu Gaarz)
Hofsee (Satow)
Hofsee (Zurow)
Hofsee (Federow)
Hofsee (Kargow)
Hofsee (Speck)